Duke Pandemonium is the second studio album by Scottish conceptual rock duo Marmaduke Duke, released on 11 May 2009 on 14th Floor Records. Band member JP Reid describes the album as "superfunky, supertight, superunique."

According to Simon Neil, the album is "a lot more cohesive" than its predecessor The Magnificent Duke. He states that the band recorded a "dance record": "I suppose it's in that kind of TV On The Radio vibe, you know, lots of grooves and beats – I'm playing keyboard live on here, I don’t really play any guitars in this band which really helps to keep me out of that usual comfort zone."

The album entered the UK Albums Chart at #14, and includes the singles: "Kid Gloves", "Rubber Lover" and "Silhouettes".

Background
Duke Pandemonium, the second instalment of Marmaduke Duke's planned trilogy of albums, was recorded soon after The Magnificent Duke. Many of the songs were performed at gigs as early as 2005, and the tracks "Everybody Dance" and "Music Show" were featured on a promo CD distributed in 2006. JP Reid states that the recording began "the day after I finished making Sucioperro's debut album, Random Acts of Intimacy. I spent two weeks in Wales then went straight into the studio and started on Duke Pandemonium."

Initially, the album was to be released during the summer of 2006, on the now defunct label, Captains Of Industry. The album was eventually released on 14th Floor Records in 2009. Simon Neil states:

unfortunately Captains Of Industry had gone under when we had made this record, and the guys at 14th Floor heard it and really loved it, and so we kind of gave them a finished piece. It's a weird one for them, in many ways – it's not normally the kind of thing they'd release, I think, but they really loved it from the off.

The delay in the album's release was also partly due to the emergent success of Biffy Clyro, bringing with it the associated increase in touring, promotion and gigs.

The album was mixed by renowned producer/mixer Rich Costey (renamed The Octopus) and was mastered by Howie Weinberg. In February 2009, "Music Show" was given away as a free download from the NME website. The NME also included the band's cover of "Friday I'm In Love" on a free compilation album in tribute to The Cure. They also performed an acoustic cover version of "Fall At Your Feet" by Crowded House for Dermot O'Leary's Radio show in February 2009.

"Erotic Robotic" was given its first play on BBC Radio 1 when Biffy Clyro stood in for Zane Lowe in early 2009. Subsequently, "Rubber Lover" was named as the "Hottest Record in the World Today" on Zane Lowe's Radio 1 show on 4 March 2009.

In early April 2009, the album was leaked in its entirety to several filesharing websites.

Whilst the CD of the album is mixed, with little to no gaps between songs, and some fading in and out over each other, the iTunes edition presents the tracks completely separated from each other, giving a slightly longer running time.

Track listing

Personnel
The Atmosphere (Simon Neil) - performance, production, recording
The Dragon (JP Reid) - performance, production, recording
The Octopus (Rich Costey) - mixing (at Electric Lady Studios, New York)
Charlie Stavish - mixing assistant
Noah Goldstein - mixing assistant
Ben Bell - additional recording (at Mayfair Studios, London)
Howie Weinberg - mastering (at Masterdisk, New York)
Matthew Agoglia - mastering assistant
Connie Mitchell - Vocals on "Kid Gloves".
Fergus Munro - Tambourine on "Heartburn", drum sample on "Kid Gloves", hi-hats on "Je Suis Un Funky Homme", snare drum on "Rubber Lover"
Michael Logg - Vocals on "Heartburn"
Kevin Wstenberg - photography
Hannah Edwards - costume design

Singles
"Kid Gloves" is the first single from the album that was released on 2 March 2009. The song received its first radio play on 18 December 2008 by Zane Lowe on BBC Radio 1. An animated video has been directed by James Price and was released in January 2009. "Kid Gloves" is due to be released across three formats featuring the following b-sides:

 "Nusrup Fateh Ali Wouldn't"
 "Nusrup Fateh Ali Can't"
 "New York Telephone Conversation Pt. 2 (Without Bowie)"
 "Kid Gloves (For Boys)"
 "Kid Gloves (For Girls) [Only available on iTunes]"

"Rubber Lover" was released on 20 April 2009 as the album's second single.
One B-side was released which is available free from NME.com and the band's official MySpace page.
"Kid Gloves (Electrically Charged Boy Remix)" (UK chart peak at #12)
"Silhouettes", the album's third single, was released on 6 July 2009.
The track was remixed by Jacknife Lee and made available as a limited edition 7" and download.

Chart positions

References

External links

Duke Pandemonium review

2009 albums